The 1902 Rhode Island gubernatorial election was held on November 4, 1902. Democratic nominee Lucius F. C. Garvin defeated incumbent Republican Charles D. Kimball with 53.99% of the vote.

General election

Candidates
Major party candidates
Lucius F. C. Garvin, Democratic
Charles D. Kimball, Republican  

Other candidates
William E. Brightman, Prohibition
Peter McDermott, Socialist Labor

Results

References

1902
Rhode Island
Gubernatorial